The average Human Development Index (HDI) for the state of Tamil Nadu in 1996 calculated by the government's State Planning Commission was 0.636. By 2001, the average HDI for the state calculated by the State Planning Commission had risen to 0.657. The 2017 Human development Index was calculated by the state planning commission by the methodology of United Nations Development Programme (UNDP) was 0.708. While comparing with the 2003 data, the latest report has also shown that the two sets of reports are not strictly comparable. Besides, some districts in Tamil Nadu had seen separation in the last fourteen years.

While the Human development index in the report of 2003 had placed Chennai, Kanchipuram, Kanyakumari, Thoothukudi and Coimbatore as the districts in the top five positions, the latest report of 2017 shows that Kanyakumari has taken the first position. Virudhunagar district has the second place now, succeeded by Thoothokudi and Chennai went to the fourth place, followed by Kanchipuram.

Human Development Index is a composite index that takes into consideration:

 Life expectancy
 Education
 Per capita income.

List of districts by HDI as of 2017 
List of districts in Tamil Nadu by Human Development Index by United Nations Development Programme (UNDP) methodology as of 2017.

HDI from 1995–2017 
Human Development Index of Indian states since 1995 by the State Planning Commission of Tamil Nadu (1995-2017)

Trend analysis 
Compared with the previous Tamil Nadu's Human Development Reports by the state planning commission and the latest district-level government statistical report, Tamil Nadu has significantly improved its HDI in all of its administrative subdivisions.

The decline of the poverty rate has been very significant for Tamil Nadu, that it takes much of the pain to the political criticism against the Dravidian parties about corruption in the administration. The substantial reduction in urban and rural poverty at a huge level since the economic improvements of the 1990s, shows that poverty reduction and social well-being programmes have brought in rising incomes for the poor.

Kanyakumari is the district with the highest Human Development Index in the report of 2017. Kanyakumari also has the highest literacy rate in the state. Ariyalur has the lowest HDI in the 2017 report. Thoothukudi, with high life expectancy and high literacy rate, is in the top five districts. Ariyalur and Perambalur, due to its Per capita income being so low, came in the bottom five. Coimbatore, in spite of its high degree of industrialisation and Per capita income, does not rank in the top five districts with high Human Development Index in the report of 2017.

The previous report of 2003 showed that Chennai, Kanchipuram, Kanyakumari, Thoothukudi and Coimbatore were the top five districts. Though the two sets of reports are not strictly comparable given the separation of some districts between the two time points, some relative observations are made. According to the latest report, Kanyakumari has reached the top position, while Coimbatore does not even figure in the top five. The new entrant in the top five district category is Virudhunagar in the latest Human development report. Virudhunagar's rise to the top has been primarily due to its relatively higher per capita income which in turn can be connected to the spread of small scale industries, and a vibrant agricultural marketing economy. The five districts in the bottom of the previous report are Perambalur, Villupuram, Dharmapuri, Tiruvannamalai and Pudukottai. Many of these districts have been separated, but Perambalur and Villupuram continue to be at the bottom. Theni has newly entered into the bottom five.

References 

Districts
 
Human Development Index
Development studies
Tamil Nadu
Health in Tamil Nadu